Werner Omar Quesada Martínez (born 24 September 1965) is a Peruvian lawyer and politician. A ranking member of the Peruvian Aprista Party, he served as the party's Institutional Secretary General from March 2010 to July 2017.

His career has been marked by controversy. Raised in the Ayacucho Region, he served as a regional party leader throughout his youth, becoming the first democratically elected governor of Ayacucho, from 2003 to 2006. In the second presidency of Alan García, he was appointed as Director of the Informal Property Formalization Agency (COFOPRI), an agency dependent of the Ministry of Housing. Upon the revelation of irregular property selling conceded by the agency, he was forced to tender his resignation in April 2010.

Early life and education
Born in the northern city of Trujillo, La Libertad, Quesada was raised in Huanta, Ayacucho. From a very young age, he registered himself in the Peruvian Aprista Party. After finishing his high school education at María Auxiliadora Grand School Unity in 1981, he travelled to Lima in order enroll in the Universidad de San Martín de Porres to study law. He was able to finish his law degree in 1996.

Simultaneously with his college education, Quesada served in a variety of positions within the Peruvian Aprista Party's Regional Committee. In 1985, he rose to the position of Deputy Regional Secretary General of the party in Ayacucho, and Provincial Secretary General for Huanta from 1992 to 1993.

Political career

Early political career 
Simultaneously with his college education, Quesada served in a variety of positions within the Peruvian Aprista Party's Regional Committee. In 1985, he rose to the position of Deputy Regional Secretary General of the party in Ayacucho, and Provincial Secretary General for Huanta from 1992 to 1993.

In 1999, the party National Convention elected Quesada as Secretary of Organization, serving in the position until his election as Ayacucho's first democratically elected governor.

Elected Mayor of the Province of Huanta in 1993, he lost reelection in 1995. In the 2002 regional elections, he was elected as the first Governor of Ayacucho. He failed to attain reelection in 2006 regional elections.

Second García Administration 
In 2007, he was appointed by the Alan García's administration as Director of the Informal Property Formalization Agency (COFOPRI). During his tenure, he was subject to controversy amidst irregularities in his management of the government agency, being accused of allowing a property in southern Lima to be sold for US$1750. A case was opened against him and six other agency officials. He resigned on 24 April 2010.

Institutional Secretary General
Upon his resignation from COFOPRI, Quesada was elected at the party's 2010 National Convention as Institutional Secretary General, alongside Jorge Del Castillo as Political Secretary General. In his seven-year tenure in the party leadership, he oversaw the ceremonies for the American Popular Revolutionary Alliance's 90th Anniversary in 2014.

At the 2016 general election, he was slated to run for a seat in the Andean Parliament with the Popular Alliance list. At the same time, Quesada dealt with the Christian People's Party on sealing negotiations in order to confirm the electoral coalition with his party and Alan García's presidential nomination. Upon the election results, he was not elected to the Andean Parliament and announced the dissolution of the coalition on 11 April 2016, following the poor results attained by the presidential ticket.

Quesada served as Institutional Secretary General until the 2017 convention elected his successor, three-term congressman Elías Rodríguez.

References 

1965 births
People from Trujillo, Peru
20th-century Peruvian lawyers
American Popular Revolutionary Alliance politicians
Living people